Archiearides is a genus of moths in the family Geometridae described by David Stephen Fletcher in 1953.

References

Archiearinae
Geometridae genera